Thomas Taplin Cooke (1782–1866) was an eminent English showman, born in Warwick, who toured in America as well as his own country.  In 1997 Cooke was inducted into the Circus Hall of Fame.

Private life
Cooke was said to have had between 13 and nineteen children who were mostly circus performers. He and his wife, Mary Anne, had a daughter Rebecca who married  and their daughter was the equestrian performer Nellie Boswell.

References 

Circus owners
Burials at Kensal Green Cemetery
People from Warwick
1782 births
1866 deaths
19th-century British businesspeople